CamKo City is a $2 billion urban development project in Phnom Penh, Cambodia. CamKo City means Cambodia and Korea City. CamKo City is the first mega infrastructure project  in Cambodia via foreign direct investment. It is chaired and approved during the Cabinet meeting in December 2005 by H.E Samdech  Prime Minister of the Royal Government of Cambodia, Hun Sen. It is fully supported by COM (Council Of Ministers) of the Kingdom of Cambodia.

CamKo City is designed to provide office space, special economic zone for global businesses, with incentives to attract business. In addition to commercial space, CamKo City will include leisure facilities, international schools, hospitals  It is constructed by World City Co., Ltd.
 CamkoCity.com
 Facebook

Location 
It is approved as a development zone for a new satellite city in February 2003 by the Bureau of Urban Planning of the Municipality of Phnom Penh.

Infrastructure 
It includes four to six lane paved roads, water supply & sewage system, stable electrical system, high speed information and telecommunication lines and systems, electronic security systems and sustainable environmental systems.
Constructions of new residential units are being imposed along with new infrastructure such as skyscrapers.

R1 Project 
Camko City R1 Project has consisting around 96,495 sqm of land area. Which has around 159,663 sqm of building floor area. R1 Project has High-Rise Condo(16 Floor) 668 units, Mid-Rise Condo(11 Floor) 159 units, Town-House (3 Floor) 164 units and Villa (3 Floor) 18 units. Eco-friendly layout, a cutting-edge security system, greatly accessible infrastructure, integrated management system and carefully designed spaces which have never seen in Cambodia. Camko City's R1 Project - a safe, convenient and environment-friendly residential community. It is also new cornerstone of Phnom Penh.

R1 Project provide multilayered security system. Which is consisting of 24/7 gate guards- security guards on duty for 24 hours per day, CCTV system- equipped with high resolution CCTV cameras, automatic door control system- access controlled by password or card keypad/card control access, security guards outside compound of Camko City- protection of security and environment outside the compound and parking lot patrolling- day and night parking lot patrol by guards.

Fully green environment, pond, garden, swimming pools, fitness center and club house make the families of residents comfortable, happy and children can play safely at playground with all those.
Camko City can be the most optimal place in Phnom Penh, Cambodia.

R2 Project 
Camko City R2 Project has consisting around 69,705.24 sqm of land area. R2 Project has 134 units of luxury villas. These villas are classified in 4 categories that are Secret Emperor, Secret Emperor Park view, Secret King and Secret Queen.

Featuring an Eco-friendly layout, a cutting-edge security system, greatly accessible infrastructure, integrated system management and carefully designed spaces which have never seen in Cambodia. Secret Garden will become milestone of premium residential estate.

 Cambodia's First Premium Complex type Villa Town- Secret garden provides the privacy of detached residences and sophisticated management system of a residential complex.
 An Urban Resort Style Premium Residence at the heart of downtown- At Secret garden, you can relax in nature as offered plentiful green zones as well as age-exclusive nature areas, outdoor swimming pools and superior community center. All in the middle of a bustling city.
 The Eco-Friendly, Eco-Passage is built within the Complex- The Vast greenbelt stretching across the entire complex and wind tunnels between each house offer a refreshing, wholesome experience only found in nature.
 Carefully Planned Road Network- The road network around and across Secret garden is carefully designed to ensure safe and clear traffic with six lanes of 20-30 meter wide roads around the perimeter and streets of varying widths of 15 meter, 10 meter, 8 meter and 6 meter across the neighborhood.
 A Smart Complex Serviced with Cutting-Edge IT System- With high-speed wired and wireless networks and cutting-edge IT system, Camko City provides high-tech services such as complex entrance control, security services, entertainment services including IPTV and other additional services.
 Safety and Privacy- Privacy an advantage of a residential complex is realized while high-tech IT cameras, CCTV and security personnel ensure safety of resident and their property.
 Integrated Management System- Everything from facility management and janitorial services to security and safety is managed through an integrated system that ensures efficiency and flawless quality of service at Secret Garden.

R2 Project ensures a spacious garden plaza enough to accommodate a large number of guests for any wedding, party or other functions.It also great for a brisk stroll with beloved family in breezy evening. High-end gym with a wide range of equipment and group exercise programs. Cafeteria provides amenities for leisure and social activities among residents. The exclusive pool recreates a resort in an urban residential complex.

Shop 
Camko City Street Mall and Retail Shops, plan for main accommodation facilities of resident's life, has achieved the commercial market for more than 1,000 houses and is regarded as local famous place already activated.
Currently activating main shops are as follows:-
 Mart & Grocery: Korean Mart, Organic Shop, Local Mart
 Restaurant: Burger Shop, Noodle Shop, Japanese BBQ, Dessert Cafe, Korean and Cambodian restaurants
 Cafe & Bakery
 Other: Cosmetics, Baby Shop, Clothing Store, Logistics

References

CamkoCity.com

 Buildings and structures in Phnom Penh